Eronia cleodora, the vine-leaf vagrant, is a butterfly of the family Pieridae. It is found throughout Africa.

The wingspan is 45–60 mm for males and 50–62 mm for females. Adults are on wing year-round in warmer areas with peaks in spring and late summer.

The larvae feed on Capparis fascicularis.

Subspecies
Eronia cleodora cleodora (southern and eastern Africa)
Eronia cleodora dilatata Butler, 1888 (coast of Kenya and Tanzania)

References

Butterflies described in 1823
Teracolini